Columbia Christian School, known as Columbia Christian or CCS, is a private Christian school in Portland, Oregon, United States. The school is affiliated with the Churches of Christ.

History 
In September 1947, Columbia Christian School, known as Columbia Bible School, opened its doors for the first time using the church of Christ building at Seventh and Hassalo Streets in Portland, Oregon. The school began with four teachers and thirty-six students in grades one through eight. From the beginning, chapel and daily Bible classes were an important part of the curriculum.

In 1949, the school obtained eight acres between 90th and 91st Streets, bordered on the north and south by Glisan and Burnside. Construction of the school building began in 1953 and was completed in 1954. This allowed the school to expand, adding a full high school. Through the remaining years of the 50s and the following decades the school continued to grow and experience progress with increased enrollment and stable leadership. A four-year college grew out of the early beginnings of the school and the academy and college were chartered and incorporated together.

In fall 1992, Columbia Christian School became independent and incorporated and appointed its own Board of Directors. The school continued to grow, and in the fall of 2000 dual accreditation was awarded to grades K-12 by Northwest Association of Accredited Schools and Association of Christian Schools International.

In summer 2009, Columbia Christian School began the Walk of Faith campaign to purchase the college campus located directly to the south of the academy. In June 2012, Columbia was able to purchase the 12-acre campus, significantly expanding its facilities and potential for continued growth.

Columbia Christian School's senior capstone class received several awards and recognition in the spring of 2014. Two groups competed in the local Project Citizen competition, and took the top two spots. The first place group had its work featured at a national showcase at the Center for Civic Education in Calabasas, California.  The group that took second place was honored by the City of Portland with the Public Safety Project Award.

In fall 2014, Columbia Christian School expanding its early childhood education program, adding a pre-school class (for 3-year-olds), while continuing to provide a pre-kindergarten class (for 4-year-olds). At the same time, sixth grade was incorporated into a new middle school, joining seventh and eighth grades (previously in junior high.

Academics
In 1991, the school received accreditation from Association of Christian Schools International, and in 1999 received accreditation from the Northwest Association of Accredited Schools.

Athletics 
Columbia Christian offers basketball, cross country, fencing, golf, soccer, track and field, and volleyball.

During the 2009–2010 season, the Columbia boys basketball team earned the state championship 1A title.

During the 2013–2014 season, the Columbia boys basketball team earned the state championship 1A title again.

The most notable alum from Columbia Christian was Kameron Chatman who was ranked at the top of 2014 class. He later went on to play at Michigan University.

During the 2017–2018 season, the Columbia boys basketball team earned the state championship 2A title.

Future 
Prompted by the closure of Cascade College in spring 2009, Columbia's administrators began a campaign to raise funds to purchase the former college campus, immediately adjacent to the academy. Entitled the "Walk of Faith", the key fundraising campaign is based on the idea of alumni and friends of the school purchasing bricks that will be engraved and placed in a walkway leading from the existing campus to the administration building at Cascade College.

In June 2012, Columbia Christian acquired the college campus. The school has since moved several high school classes to the campus addition as well as opened a Student Center and Cafe' in the former student union. School enrollment continues to increase with the addition of the new facilities, and approaches 300 students.

See also 
 List of high schools in Oregon

References 

Christian schools in Oregon
Educational institutions established in 1947
Churches of Christ
High schools in Portland, Oregon
Schools accredited by the Northwest Accreditation Commission
Private middle schools in Oregon
Private elementary schools in Oregon
Private high schools in Oregon
1947 establishments in Oregon